Paróquia Nossa Senhora da Consolação is a church located in São Paulo, SP, Brazil. The church was founded in 1799 and reformed in 1840.

References

Roman Catholic churches in São Paulo